The 1943 New Mexico A&M Aggies football team was an American football team that represented New Mexico College of Agriculture and Mechanical Arts (now known as New Mexico State University) as an independent during the 1943 college football season. The team was drawn from the Army Specialized Training Program (ASTP) and was sometimes referred to as the ASTP Aggies. In their first year under head coach Maurice Moulder, the Aggies compiled a 4–0 record and outscored opponents by a total of 166 to 75. The team played its home games at Quesenberry Field in Las Cruces, New Mexico.

Schedule

References

New Mexico AandM
New Mexico State Aggies football seasons
New Mexico AandM Aggies football